Rubén López García-Madrid (born 9 July 1979) is a Spanish professional footballer who plays as a central defender.

He amassed Segunda División totals of 86 matches and three goals over four seasons, mainly in representation of Terrassa, adding 159 games (three goals) in Segunda División B.

López also played in Austria and Hong Kong.

Club career

Terrassa
Born in Barcelona, Catalonia, López started his professional career at already 22, with Terrassa FC in Segunda División B. He made his official debut for the club on 7 October 2001 against CD Binéfar, and went on to appear in a further 22 games as the season ended in promotion – he was sent off three times in the process, however.

In the following campaigns, López was only first-choice in 2002–03, starting in 30 of his 34 league appearances whilst often partnering Héctor Bueno. He featured in just 16 matches in 2004–05, as his team returned to the third level.

Numancia / Terrassa return
López joined Segunda División club CD Numancia before the start of 2005–06. He played regularly during the first half of the season whilst scoring in a 1–1 home draw against Ciudad de Murcia, but featured rarely in the second part, leaving Soria in June 2006.

López returned to Terrassa in July 2006, receiving his marching orders in his first two matches, home fixtures against CD Alcoyano (1–0 win) and UE Lleida (1–1). He left at the end of the division three campaign, and continued to compete in the third tier in the following three years, with UD Vecindario and UD Melilla.

LASK Linz
In January 2011, López signed for Austrian Football Bundesliga club LASK Linz. He made his debut for his new team on 12 February, against SV Mattersburg.

López started in all his league appearances during his short stint, with the side being relegated at the end of the season.

Southern
On 13 July 2012, after one season back in his country with CF Palencia, López joined Southern District RSA, newly promoted to the Hong Kong First Division League. He was appointed new team captain the following year, after Wisdom Fofo Agbo's departure.

Club statistics

References

External links

HKFA profile

1979 births
Living people
Footballers from Barcelona
Spanish footballers
Association football defenders
Segunda División players
Segunda División B players
Terrassa FC footballers
CD Numancia players
UD Vecindario players
UD Melilla footballers
CF Palencia footballers
Austrian Football Bundesliga players
LASK players
Hong Kong First Division League players
Southern District FC players
Yokohama FC Hong Kong players
Spanish expatriate footballers
Expatriate footballers in Austria
Expatriate footballers in Hong Kong
Spanish expatriate sportspeople in Austria
Spanish expatriate sportspeople in Hong Kong